The men's 200 metres at the 2012 African Championships in Athletics was held at the Stade Charles de Gaulle on 30 June and 1 July.

Medalists

Records

Schedule

Results

Round 1
First 2 in each heat (Q) and 8 best performers (q) advance to the Semifinals.

Wind:Heat 1: 0.0 m/s, Heat 2: +0.4 m/s, Heat 3: 0.0 m/s, Heat 4: 0.0 m/s, Heat 5: +0.1 m/s, Heat 6: -0.3 m/s, Heat 7 -0.3 m/s, Heat 8: -0.6 m/s

Semifinals
First 2 in each heat (Q) and 2 best performers (q) advance to the Final.

Wind:Heat 1: -0.2 m/s, Heat 2: -1.2 m/s, Heat 3: -1.0 m/s

Final
Wind: -1.4 m/s

References

Results

200 Men
200 metres at the African Championships in Athletics